Collins Creek is a stream in the U.S. state of Idaho.

Collins Creek was named after Private John Collins of the Lewis and Clark Expedition.

References

Rivers of Clearwater County, Idaho
Rivers of Shoshone County, Idaho
Rivers of Idaho